Denny de Jesús Hernández Martínez (born ) is a Cuban male volleyball player. He is part of the Cuba men's national volleyball team. On club level he plays for Pinar Del Rio.

References

External links
 profile at FIVB.org

1994 births
Living people
Cuban men's volleyball players
Place of birth missing (living people)
21st-century Cuban people